= Fender TR 105 =

Wireless remote system for electric guitars, basses and accordions

The Fender TR 105 was a wireless remote system with a range of up to 60 feet, for electric guitars, basses and accordions. The system introduced by Fender in 1961. Jeff Owens writes, "...the TR 105 worked reasonably well, but it didn't catch on and was discontinued in less than a year." MusicRadar traces the availability of cable-free set-ups to this model.
